In literary criticism, autofiction is a form of fictionalized autobiography.

Autofiction combines two mutually inconsistent narrative forms, namely autobiography, and fiction. An author may decide to recount their life in the third person, to modify significant details and characters, using fictive subplots and imagined scenarios with real-life characters in the service of a search for self. In this way, autofiction shares similarities with the Bildungsroman as well as the New Narrative movement and has parallels with faction, a genre devised by Truman Capote to describe his novel In Cold Blood.

Serge Doubrovsky coined the term in 1977 with reference to his novel Fils. However, autofiction arguably existed as an intergeneric practice with ancient roots long before Doubrovsky coined the term. Michael Skafidas argues that the first-person narrative can be traced back to the confessional subtleties of Sappho's lyric "I." Philippe Vilain distinguishes autofiction from autobiographical novels in that autofiction requires a first-person narrative by a protagonist who has the same name as the author. Elizabeth Hardwick's novel Sleepless Nights and Chris Kraus's I Love Dick have been deemed early seminal works popularizing the form of autofiction. Critics and journalists have polarized views on the genre.

In India, autofiction has been associated with the works of Hainsia Olindi and postmodern Tamil writer Charu Nivedita. His novel Zero Degree, a groundbreaking work in Tamil literature and his recent Novel Marginal Man are examples of this genre. In Urdu the fiction novels of Rahman Abbas are considered major work of autofiction, especially his two novels Nakhalistan Ki Talash (In Search of an Oasis) and Khuda Ke Saaye Mein Ankh Micholi (Hide and Seek in the Shadow of God). Japanese author Hitomi Kanehara wrote a novel titled Autofiction.

In a 2018 article for New York magazines "Vulture", literary critic Christian Lorentzen wrote, "The term autofiction has been in vogue for the past decade to describe a wave of very good American novels by the likes of Sheila Heti, Ben Lerner, Teju Cole, Jenny Offill, and Tao Lin, among others, as well as the multivolume epic My Struggle by the Norwegian Karl Ove Knausgaard." He elaborated: The way the term is used tends to be unstable, which makes sense for a genre that blends fiction and what may appear to be fact into an unstable compound. In the past, I've tried to make a distinction in my own use of the term between autobiographical fiction, autobiographical metafiction, and autofiction, arguing that in autofiction there tends to be an emphasis on the narrator's or protagonist's or authorial alter ego's status as a writer or artist and that the book's creation is inscribed in the book itself.

Notable authors 

Aldo Busi
Amélie Nothomb
Andrew Durbin
Anne Wiazemsky
Annie Ernaux
Ayad Akhtar
Ben Lerner
Catherine Millet
Charles Bukowski
Chloe Delaume
Chris Kraus
Christine Angot
Curzio Malaparte
Doireann Ní Ghríofa
Durga Chew-Bose
Édouard Louis
Eileen Myles
Elizabeth Hardwick
Emily Segal
Emmanuel Carrère
Emmelie Prophète
Guillaume Dustan
Henry Miller
Hervé Guibert
Hunter S. Thompson
J. M. Coetzee
Jack Kerouac
James Baldwin
James Joyce
Karl Ove Knausgaard
Louis-Ferdinand Céline
Marcel Proust
Marguerite Duras
Megan Boyle
Natasha Stagg
Ocean Vuong
Olivia Rosenthal
Patricia Lockwood
Philip Roth
Rachel Cusk
Sheila Heti
Sherman Alexie
Sven Hassel
Tao Lin
Teju Cole
Vassilis Alexakis

See also 
Autobiografiction
Autobiographical novel
Biography in literature
Fake memoir
I-novel
Non-fiction novel
Roman à clef

References

 
Narrative forms
Autobiographies
Docudramas